Barry MacKay (born Barry Leonard Graham Reay-Mackey; 8 January 1906 – 12 December 1985) was an English actor.

He was most prominently seen in light comedic roles in the British cinema of the 1930s and is perhaps best known as Jessie Matthews' leading man in Evergreen (1934), Gangway (1937) and Sailing Along (1938). On Stage he performed at the Comedy Theatre, London, in the Green Room Rags of 2 December 1934; opposite Ann Todd in the sketch Every Twenty Thousand Years.

Other notable roles include Lieutenant Somerville in Brown on Resolution (1935) and as Fred, Scrooge's nephew, in MGM's film A Christmas Carol (1938), the latter being one of two films he made in the US; the other was the lead role in a B-picture, Smuggled Cargo (1939). After these films and serving in the Canadian navy during WW II, followed by stage work, there was a long gap in his film career until he reappeared as a character actor in the 1950s, making his last film (Timeslip a.k.a. The Atomic Man ) in 1955.

Barry also appeared in the 1954 Sheldon Reynolds produced Sherlock Holmes television series. He portrayed Reggie "Sardines" Taunton in episode 17; "The Case of the Laughing Mummy".

Filmography

References

External links

Barry MacKay at Allmovie

1906 births
1985 deaths
20th-century English male actors
English male stage actors
English male film actors
English male television actors
Male actors from London